The Egyptian Football Association is the governing body of football in Egypt. A member of FIFA since 1923 and a founding member of CAF, the EFA has jurisdiction for the Egyptian football league system and is in charge of the men's and women's national teams. The EFA headquarters is located in Gezira, Cairo. The EFA organizes the semi-professional Egyptian Second Division alongside the lower regional leagues in the third and fourth level of the league system.

Controversy

Christians comprise about 10–20% of Egypt's population, the majority of which are Coptic Orthodox Christians. However, there is no Christian representation on the national team. Furthermore, there are no Christians throughout the Egyptian Professional league's 540 roster spots. This disparity is believed to be due to the bias against accepting young talented Christian players at the clubs' youth level throughout the national league. This disparity has resulted in many Christians not feeling represented by the national team.
 		
There have been complaints from the pro Christian group Coptic Solidarity filed to FIFA regarding the purposeful exclusion of Christians from the league, as well as their exclusion from Egypt's national team. A similar complaint was filled by Coptic Solidarity to the International Olympics Committee regarding the similar exclusion of Christians on Egypt's Olympic teams. The exclusions are cited as being systemic persecution against the Coptic Christians. Neither FIFA nor the IOC has taken action or conducted independent research to investigate these complaints.

See also
Egyptian Premier League
Egypt Cup
Egyptian Super Cup
Egypt national football team
Egypt women's national football team

References

External links

Official website
Egypt at FIFA site
Egypt at CAF site

Football
Egypt
Football in Egypt
Futsal in Egypt
1921 establishments in Egypt
Sports organizations established in 1921